An echo vowel, also known as a synharmonic vowel, is a paragogic vowel that repeats the final vowel in a word in speech.

Languages
In modern Sanskrit, echo vowels are often added in pronunciation to the visarga.

In Rukai, an Austronesian language, vowels are pronounced as full vowels but are predictable and disappear when they are under reduplication or when a suffix beginning with /a/ is added to the word:

Similarly, in the related Uneapa, echo vowels are added after a Proto-Oceanic final consonant, such as *Rumaq "house" > rumaka.

The Makassaric languages also occurs the echo vowels with stems ending in final /r/, /l/ or /s/. E.g. /botol/ "bottle" is realized as bótolo in Selayar and Coastal Konjo, and as bótoloʔ in Makassarese (the latter regularly adds a glottal stop to the echo vowel). This echo vowel is dropped if a suffix is added, but retained if followed by an enclitic.

Echo vowels have also been reconstructed for Proto-Macro-Jê.

Syllabaries
Echo vowels are also found in writing, especially with syllabaries. For example, a word kab may be written as if it were kaba, and keb would be written as if it were kebe. Such a system is found in Maya, with complications depending on the quality of the preceding vowel. In Linear B, such final consonants were simply not written. However, consonant clusters were separated with echo vowels: the city of Knossos is written as if it were Konoso (Linear B: , ko-no-so).

In Ainu, some writers write final /r/ with a subscript kana for ra, re, ri, ro or ru, depending on the preceding vowel, but others use a subscript ru in all cases.

See also
Paragoge (paragogic vowel)

References

Chumash Glossary

Orthography
Phonetics